The Porto Challenger is a professional tennis tournament in Portugal that was part of the ATP Challenger Series. Held in Porto, the first edition of the tournament was in 1982, then it was contested every year from 1987 to 1994, biannually in 1991, 1992 and 1993. It continued as a semi regular event until 1998, before returning in 2021.

Past finals

Singles

Doubles

References
Official website of the International Tennis Federation

ATP Challenger Tour
Clay court tennis tournaments
Hard court tennis tournaments
Sports competitions in Porto
Tennis tournaments in Portugal
Recurring sporting events established in 1982